Kuşluca ("(place) with birds") a very small village in the Erdemli district of Mersin Province, Turkey. There are forests around the village and the village is named after the birdsongs from the forest. Until 2005, Kuşluca was a hamlet. It still has a very low population. The settled (winter) population of Toros was only 34  in 2012. During the summers the population may increase. The main economic activities of the village are vegetable agriculture and animal husbandry. The main crops are fruits.

References

Villages in Erdemli District